The Expressions may refer to:

 The Expressions, American rhythm & blues band that backed Lee Fields
 The Expression,  Australian synth-pop band